Lugulu is a settlement in Busia County, Kenya.

References 

Populated places in Western Province (Kenya)
Bungoma County